is one of the syllables in Javanese script that represents the sound /mɔ/, /ma/. It is transliterated to Latin as "ma", and sometimes in Indonesian orthography as "mo".

Pasangan 
Its pasangan form , is located on the bottom side of the previous syllable. For example,  - anak macan (little tiger).

Murda 
The letter ꦩ doesn't have a murda form.

Glyphs

Unicode block 

Javanese script was added to the Unicode Standard in October, 2009 with the release of version 5.2.

References 

Javanese script